Cochlis is a genus of predatory sea snails, marine gastropod mollusks in the subfamily Naticinae of the family Naticidae, the moon snails.

Species
 Cochlis neglecta (Mayer, 1858) †
 Cochlis raropunctata (Sasso, 1827) †
 Cochlis sulcooperculata (Ruggieri, 1949) †
 Cochlis vittata (Gmelin, 1791)
Species brought into synonymy
 Cochlis alapapilionis Röding, 1798: synonym of Naticarius alapapilionis Röding, 1798(original combination)
 Cochlis albula Röding, 1798: synonym of Natica spadicea (Gmelin, 1791)
 Cochlis cornea Röding, 1798: synonym of Natica spadicea (Gmelin, 1791)
 Cochlis explanata Röding, 1798: synonym of Naticarius orientalis (Gmelin, 1791)
 Cochlis fanel Röding, 1798: synonym of Natica hebraea (Martyn, 1786): synonym of Naticarius hebraeus (Martyn, 1786)
 Cochlis flammea Röding, 1798: synonym of Natica vittata (Gmelin, 1791): synonym of Cochlis vittata (Gmelin, 1791)
 Cochlis lineata Röding, 1798: synonym of Tanea lineata Röding, 1798(original combination)
 Cochlis migratoria Powell, 1927: synonym of Notocochlis gualteriana (Récluz, 1844)
 Cochlis onca Röding, 1798: synonym of Naticarius onca Röding, 1798(original combination)
 Cochlis pavimentum Röding, 1798: synonym of Naticarius onca (Röding, 1798)
 Cochlis pittensis Marwick, 1928 †: synonym of Tanea pittensis (Marwick, 1928) †
 Cochlis plicata Röding, 1798: synonym of Stigmaulax sulcatus (Born, 1778)
 Cochlis rufescens Röding, 1798: synonym of Natica spadicea (Gmelin, 1791)
 Cochlis socius Finlay, 1927 †: synonym of Tanea consortis (Finlay, 1924) † (Invalid replacement name for Natica consortis Finlay, 1924)
 Cochlis stercusmuscarum (Gmelin, 1791): synonym of Naticarius stercusmuscarum (Gmelin, 1791)
 Cochlis tigrina Röding, 1798: synonym of Paratectonatica tigrina Röding, 1798(original combination)
 Cochlis undulata Röding, 1798: synonym of Tanea undulata Röding, 1798(original combination)
 Cochlis vafer Finlay, 1930: synonym of Notocochlis gualteriana (Récluz, 1844)

References

 Torigoe K. & Inaba A. (2011). Revision on the classification of Recent Naticidae. Bulletin of the Nishinomiya Shell Museum. 7: 133 + 15 pp., 4 pls
 Robba E., Pedriali L. & Quaggiotto E. (2016). Eocene, Oligocene and Miocene naticid gastropods of northern Italy. Rivista Italiana di Paleontologia e Stratigrafia. 122(2): 109-234.

External links

 Röding, P.F. (1798). Museum Boltenianum sive Catalogus cimeliorum e tribus regnis naturæ quæ olim collegerat Joa. Fried Bolten, M. D. p. d. per XL. annos proto physicus Hamburgensis. Pars secunda continens Conchylia sive Testacea univalvia, bivalvia & multivalvia. Trapp, Hamburg. viii, 199 pp

Naticidae